The color Byzantium is a particular dark tone of purple. It originates in modern times, and, despite its name, it should not be confused with Tyrian purple (hue rendering), the color historically used by Roman and Byzantine emperors. The latter, often also referred to as "Tyrian red", is more reddish in hue, and is in fact often depicted as closer to crimson than purple. The first recorded use of byzantium as a color name in English was in 1926.

Variations of byzantium

Byzantine

The color Byzantine is displayed at right.

The color Byzantine is a rich tone of medium purple toned toward magenta.

The first recorded use of byzantine as a color name in English was in 1924.

Dark byzantium

The color dark Byzantium is displayed at right.

References

See also
 List of colors

Shades of violet